Mind Matters (） is a 20-episode drama series produced by Mediacorp Channel 8. The show aired at 9pm on weekdays and had a repeat telecast at 8am the following day. It stars Qi Yuwu and Jesseca Liu as the casts of this series.

Cast

{| class="wikitable"
|-
!style="background:#DDA0DD"| Cast 
!style="background:#DDA0DD"| Character 
!style="background:#DDA0DD"| Description
|-
| Qi Yuwu  戚玉武 || Zhuo Jinshu  卓瑾澍 || 
Repair Toilet Brother(修马桶哥), Mr Toilet (马桶哥), Dr. Zhuo / Dr. Toh (卓医生)
Suffering from “Complex Post Traumatic Stress Disorder– CPTSD  .” '
Past work as a celebrity psychiatrist
Recent work as a plumber
Song Jiefang's ex-boyfriend
Qin Xiuxiu's love interest and boyfriend
|-
| Jesseca Liu  刘子绚 || Qin Xiuxiu  秦秀秀 || Ugly Face Woman (臭脸婆)Suffering from “Obsessive–compulsive disorder and PTSD .” Fang Zhixing's Mother
work as a tailor
|-
| Teresa Tseng  曾咏熙|| Lu Haining  卢海宁||Dr. LooSuffering from “ Bulimia Nervosa” work as a celebrity psychiatrist
Zhuo Jinshu's love interest 
|-
| Florence Tan  陈秀丽|| Zhou Riqing  周日晴||Suffering from “Bipolar 1 disorder""work as a clothes seller
|-
| Chen Tianwen  陈天文|| Lu Liangsheng  陆亮声 ||Mr. LokeSuffering from “Fetishistic disorder  ”   Works as a school teacher
Qin Xiuxiu's Love Interest
|-
| Shane Pow  包勋评|| Hu Ruiming  胡锐铭 || Younger Version portrayed by 梁其诚Suffering from “Agrophobia ” work as a free-lance software engineer
|-
| Denise Camillia Tan  陈楚寰 || Zhang Siya  章偲雅 || Suffering from “Schizophrenia” work as a part-time model
Undergraduate student studying business management
|-
| Ben Yeo  杨志龙|| Chen Weiyi  陈伟毅 ||Suffering from mild “Social anxiety ” Zhou Riqing's Love Interest
|-
| Sora Ma  马艺瑄 || Song Jiefang  宋洁芳 ||Suffering from “Delusional disorder” Zhuo Jinshu's ex-girlfriend
(Deceased after jumping down a building with Zhuo Jinshu)
|-
| Ivan Lo  卢楷浚|| Fang Zhixing  方智星 || Younger Version Portrayed by Cruz TaySuffering from “Conduct disorder” Qin Xiuxiu's Son
|-
|Zhang Wei
张为
|Uncle David
|Suffering from “Hoarding disorder .”  Zhuo Jinshu's customer
|-
|Teo Ser Lee
张思丽
|Li Ting
丽婷
|
 Zhou Riqing's aunt
 Owns a clothing shop at a neighbourhood estate
|-
|Benjamin Heng
王智国
|Fang Zhengye
方正业
|Main Villain(Suffering from "Psychopathy）" Qin Xiuxiu's ex-husband
 Took nude photos of Qin Xiuxiu, divorced her due to his jail term and caused her to have PTSD
 Abused Fang Zhixing and causes his oppositional defiant disorder 
|-
|
|Adele
|
 Zhang Siya's best friend
|-
| Patricia Seow  萧靖亲 || Mrs Pui || 
 Fang Zhixing's Teacher
 Beaten up by Fang Zhixing in episode 8, suffered serious injuries.
|}

Original Sound Track (OST)

Awards & NominationsMind Matters' is up for 5 nominations.

The other drama serials nominated for Best Theme Song are Blessings 2 , VIC , You Can Be An Angel 3 &  Reach For The Skies''.

It did not win any of the nomination.

Star Awards 2019

See also
 List of MediaCorp Channel 8 Chinese drama series (2010s)

References

Mediacorp Chinese language programmes
2018 Singaporean television series debuts
Channel 8 (Singapore) original programming